William J. Murphy was an Indian middle-distance runner. He competed in the men's 800 metres at the 1928 Summer Olympics.

References

1903 births
Year of death missing
Athletes (track and field) at the 1928 Summer Olympics
Indian male middle-distance runners
Olympic athletes of India
Place of birth missing